Louis Atwell Olney (1875, Providence, Rhode Island, United States – 1949) was a pioneering textile chemist and educator.

He was the founder and first president of the American Association of Textile Chemists and Colorists which in 1944 established the Olney Medal, in his honor, to recognize outstanding achievements in textile or polymer chemistry or other fields of chemistry of major importance to textile science.

Bibliography

References 

1875 births
1949 deaths

American chemists